Abuse of Weakness is a 2013 semi-autobiographical film written and directed by Catherine Breillat. The film had its world premiere on 6 September 2013 at the Toronto International Film Festival. In the United States, the film was acquired by Strand Releasing and given a release in December 2014.

Plot
Maud Shainberg suffers a cerebral hemorrhage that leaves her paralysed on one half of her body. After a year of intense therapy Maud, a director, begins to work on a new project. After seeing an interview with a con-man, Vilko Piran, she immediately asks him to star as the lead in her film, about a lower-class man who falls in love with a famous actress, eventually beating her to death. Vilko accepts but insists that he see Maud as much as possible before filming begins.

Cast
 Isabelle Huppert as Maud Schoenberg 
 Kool Shen as Vilko Piran 
 Laurence Ursino as Andy 
 Christophe Sermet as Ezzé 
 Ronald Leclercq as Gino 
 Fred Lebelge as TV presenter
 Tristan Schotte as Antoine 
 Daphné Baiwir as Hortense 
 Dimitri Tomsej as Louis  
 Nicolas Steil as Louis' father
 Jean-François Lepetit as Jean-Paul

Production
In 2007, Breillat met notorious conman Christophe Rocancourt, and offered him a leading role in a film that she was planning to make, based on her own novel Bad Love, and starring Naomi Campbell. Soon after, she gave him €25,000 to write a screenplay titled La vie amoureuse de Christophe Rocancourt (The Love Life of Christophe Rocancourt), and over the next year and a half, would give him loans totalling an additional €678,000. In 2009, a book written by Breillat was published, in which she alleged that Rocancourt had taken advantage of her diminished mental capacity, as she was still recovering from her stroke. The book was entitled Abus de faiblesse, a French legal term usually translated as "abuse of weakness" and was the basis for the movie of the same title.

Reception
Review aggregation website Rotten Tomatoes reported an approval rating of 85%, based on 34 reviews, with an average score of 6.7/10. The site's critics consensus reads, "Abuse of Weakness fact-based plot proves that truth can be stranger than fiction – and provide grist for compelling character studies." At Metacritic, which assigns a normalized rating out of 100 to reviews from mainstream critics, the film received an average score of 77, based on 16 reviews, indicating "generally favorable reviews".

References

External links
 
 

2013 films
2013 drama films
2010s French-language films
Belgian drama films
Drama films based on actual events
Films about con artists
Films about filmmaking
Films directed by Catherine Breillat
Films shot in Brussels
French-language Belgian films
French drama films
French films based on actual events
German drama films
German films based on actual events
2010s French films
2010s German films